Proti Island of Messenia (Πρώτη Μεσσηνίας) is an island in the Ionian Sea, on the west coast of the Peloponnese; it is counted as one of the Ionian Islands, though administratively, it is part of the municipality of Gargalianoi, in the regional unit of Messenia.  The 2001 census reported a population of four inhabitants.

Description
The name of the island derives from the ancient sea god Proteus, son of Poseidon. The island was mentioned by ancient writers. The first reference of the island was in the history of Thukydides who refers that in 426 B.C. the Athenian fleet sailed around this island. Proti has archaeological interest, since on the island, there is a Mycenaean acropolis.

References

Islands of Greece
Ionian Islands
Landforms of Messenia
Islands of Peloponnese (region)